John Daniel Barron (January 26, 1930 – February 24, 2005) was an American journalist and investigative writer. He wrote several books about Soviet espionage via the KGB and other agencies.

Early life

John Barron was born January 26, 1930, in Wichita Falls, Texas, the son of a Methodist minister.

He graduated from the University of Missouri and studied Russian at the United States Naval Postgraduate School in Monterey, California. He served in Berlin as a naval intelligence officer.

Journalistic career

In 1957, he joined the Washington Star as an investigative reporter. In 1965, Barron joined the Washington bureau of Reader's Digest.  There he wrote more than 100 stories on a wide variety of subjects—notably a 1980 story concerning unanswered questions surrounding the drowning death of Mary Jo Kopechne at Chappaquiddick in a car driven by Ted Kennedy.

After Barron published his 1974 book KGB: The Secret Work of Soviet Secret Agents, the KGB attempted to discredit him by faking claims that Barron was part of a Zionist conspiracy as well as "...made much of his Jewish origins...". In 1996, Barron published a book detailing the saga of the Federal Bureau of Investigation's Operation SOLO, involving the infiltration of the top leadership of the Communist Party, USA by the FBI's secret informant Morris Childs. From 1958 through 1977, Childs traveled to Moscow over 50 times, acting as a courier between the CPUSA and Communist Party of the Soviet Union. Childs was instrumental in helping with the transfer of over $28 million from the Communist Party of the Soviet Union to the Communist Party of the US to help fund its activities, with each transaction painstakingly reported by Childs to his FBI handlers.  This story had been told, in fictional form, in Baynard Kendrick's 1959 novel Hot Red Money.

Barron's and co-author Anthony Paul's 1977 book Murder of a Gentle Land: The Untold Story of Communist Genocide in Cambodia was important in overturning the Cambodian genocide denial and the myth that the Khmer Rouge rulers of Cambodia were benign agrarian reformers.

Death and legacy

John Barron died in Virginia on February 24, 2005. He was 75 years old at the time of his death.

Barron's papers are held by the Hoover Institution Archives at Stanford University in Palo Alto, California.

Works

 KGB: The Secret Work of Soviet Secret Agents. New York: Reader's Digest Press, 1974. London: Hodder & Stoughton, 1974. [pb] New York: Bantam Books, 1974.
 Murder of a gentle land: the untold story of a Communist genocide in Cambodia, Authors John Barron, Anthony Paul, Reader's Digest Press, 1977.
 MiG Pilot: The Final Escape of Lieutenant Belenko, New York: McGraw-Hill, 1980.
 "The KGB's Magical War for 'Peace'" in Ernest W. Lefever and E. Stephen Hunt (eds.), The Apocalyptic Premise: Nuclear Arms Debated: Thirty-one Essays by Statesmen, Scholars, Religious Leaders, and Journalists. Lanham, MD: Rowman and Littlefield, 1982.
 KGB Today: The Hidden Hand. New York: Berkley Books, 1983.
 Breaking the Ring: The Bizarre Case of the Walker Family Spy Ring, John Anthony Walker. Boston: Houghton Mifflin, 1987.
  Operation SOLO: The FBI's Man in the Kremlin, Washington, DC: Regnery, 1996.

See also

 Morris Childs
 Cambodian genocide denial

Footnotes

Further reading
 Christopher Andrew and Vasili Mitrokhin (1999), The Sword and the Shield:  The Mitrokhin Archive and the Secret History of the KGB, New York:  Basic Books.
 Christopher Andrew and Vasili Mitrokhin (2005), The Mitrokhin Archive II:  The KGB and the World, New York:  Allan Lane.
 Christopher Andrew and Vasili Mitrokhin (2005), The World Was Going Our Way:  The KGB and the Battle for the Third World, New York:  Basic Books.
 Anthony Cave Brown and Charles B. MacDonald (1981), On a Field of Red:  The Communist International and the Coming of World War II .
 Baynard Kendrick (1959), Hot Red Money, New York:  Dodd, Mead.

External links
 Lora Soroka and Xiuzhi Zhou, "Register of the John Barron Papers, 1927–1996," Palo Alto, CA: Hoover Institution Archives, Stanford University, 1999.
 Matt Schudel, "John Barron Dies; Espionage Reporter", The Washington Post, March 9, 2005; Page B06.
 John Miller, "He shot down Commies", National Review online.
 William Schultz, "Remembering long time Communist conspiracy fighter John Barron", Human Events.

1930 births
2005 deaths
American political writers
American male non-fiction writers
George Polk Award recipients
University of Missouri alumni
American historians of espionage
20th-century American historians
People of the Office of Naval Intelligence
20th-century American male writers